Wanlaweyn (Maay: Wanliwiing) is a town in the southern Lower Shebelle region of Somalia. Situated around 90km (50 miles) northwest of the capital Mogadishu, it is the center of the Wanlaweyn District.

Demographics
Wanlaweyn has a population of around 27,600 inhabitants. The broader Wanlaweyn District has a total population of 250,643 residents. The town is predominantly inhabited by the Shanta Caleemood clan sub-division of the Digil Rahanweyn Somalis.

History 
During the 1961 Somali constitutional referendum, in order to secure a substantial "Yes" vote for southerners, the small town reported 100,000 votes. This was higher than total ballots cast in the North (British Somaliland), therefore Northerners became suspicious of the political nature of Southerners. As a result, coining the new term "Wanlaweyn" for Southerners, which is still used today.

Notes

References
Wanlaweyn, Somalia

Populated places in Lower Shebelle